Shahjehan is a 1946 Indian Hindi language film. The film was directed by Abdul Rashid Kardar and written by Kamal Amrohi. It starred K. L. Saigal, Ragini, Kanwar, Nasreen and P. Jairaj. The music was composed by Naushad with Majrooh Sultanpuri and Khumar Barabankavi making his debut as a lyricist in this film. The story was a fictionalized account of an episode during the reign of Emperor Shahjehan. It was the second highest grossing Indian film of 1946.

Cast
 K. L. Saigal as Suhail
 P. Jairaj as Shirazi
 Ragni as Ruhi
 Kanwar as Shah Jahan
 Nasreen as Mumtaz
 Mohammed Afzal Rizvi as Jwala Singh
 Sulochana Chatterjee as Janfiza
 Rehman as Ghulam

Soundtrack
The music of the film was composed by Naushad.

References

External links
 

1946 films
1940s Hindi-language films
Films directed by A. R. Kardar
Films scored by Naushad
Indian black-and-white films
Indian romantic drama films
1946 romantic drama films
Cultural depictions of Shah Jahan
Films set in the Mughal Empire